Ichthyophis youngorum, the Doi Suthep caecilian, is a species of amphibian in the family Ichthyophiidae. It is known only from 10 adult and 13 larval specimens collected in 1957 by Edward Harrison Taylor.

References 

 
 

youngorum
Amphibians of Thailand
Amphibians described in 1960
Taxonomy articles created by Polbot